Azmi T. Mikati (born 21 September 1972) is a Lebanese businessman. He is the CEO of M1 Group, a company founded by his father and uncle.

Early life
He is the son of Taha Mikati and nephew of current Prime Minister of Lebanon, Najib Mikati. Mikati studied at Columbia University, New York, graduating in 1994 with a Bachelor of Sciences from the Fu Foundation School of Engineering and Applied Science.

Career 
Mikati founded T-One, a US based telecommunications company specialising in international services in 1994, whilst studying engineering at Columbia University. T-One was sold to a publicly traded US company in 1997. In 1998, he was appointed CEO of emerging market mobile phone company, Investcom.

Investcom, founded in 1982, was a Middle Eastern mobile telecommunications network provider. Under Mikati's leadership, the company's sales grew from $30 million to close to $1 billion. In 2005, Investcom was added to the Dubai International Financial Exchange and the London Stock Exchange (LSE) in what was known to be the largest listing of a Middle Eastern company on the LSE, making Mikati the youngest CEO of a publicly traded Middle Eastern company at the time.
The following year, Investcom was bought by the leading African mobile operator MTN for $5.5 billion.  Mikati was appointed Non-Executive Director of the MTN Group in July 2006.

Mikati is CEO of the M1 Group, a family investment holding company that was founded by former Lebanese Prime Minister Najib Mikati and his brother Taha. In addition to holding a 10% stake in the South Africa-based telecommunications company MTN, M1 Group is invested in various sectors and geographies such as real estate, aviation, cement, fashion, retail, energy and banking.

References 

Living people
1972 births
Lebanese Muslims
People from Tripoli, Lebanon
Columbia School of Engineering and Applied Science alumni
Lebanese chief executives
Mikati family